The String eel (Gordiichthys leibyi) is a species of eels in the family Ophichthidae (worm/snake eels). It was described by John E. McCosker and James Erwin Böhlke in 1984. It is a marine, temperate water-dwelling eel which is known from the western central and northwestern Atlantic Ocean, including Florida, USA; Puerto Rico, and Canada.

References

Ophichthidae
Fish described in 1984